Protection or Free Trade is a book published in 1886 by the economist and social philosopher, Henry George. Its sub-title is An Examination of the Tariff Question with Especial Regard to the Interests of Labor. As the title suggests, George examined the debate between protectionism and free trade.

George was opposed to tariffs, which were at the time both the major method of protectionist trade policy and an important source of federal revenue. He argued that tariffs kept prices high for consumers, while failing to produce any increase in overall wages. He also believed that tariffs protected monopolistic companies from competition, thus augmenting their power. Like Progress and Poverty, much of the book was devoted to attacking privileges, such as land monopoly, which limit trade and rob value from producers.

Largely as a result of this book, free trade became a major issue in federal politics. Protection or Free Trade was the first book to be read entirely into the Congressional Record. It was read aloud by five Democratic congressmen.

"True free trade"
George defended what he considered "true free trade". For him, this required free trade to be coupled with the treatment of land as common property:

Free trade means free production. Now fully to free production it is necessary not only to remove all taxes on production, but also to remove all other restrictions on production. True free trade, in short, requires that the active factor of production, Labor, shall have free access to the passive factor of production, Land. To secure this all monopoly of land must be broken up, and the equal right of all to the use of the natural elements must be secured by the treatment of the land as the common property in usufruct of the whole people.

Acclaim
In 1997, Spencer MacCallum wrote that Henry George was "undeniably the greatest writer and orator on free trade who ever lived."

In 2009, Tyler Cowen wrote that George's 1886 book Protection or Free Trade "remains perhaps the best-argued tract on free trade to this day."

Jim Powell said that Protection or Free Trade was probably the best book on trade written by anyone in the Americas, comparing it Adam Smith's Wealth of Nations.

Milton Friedman said it was the most rhetorically brilliant work ever written on trade. Friedman also paraphrased one of George's arguments in favor of free trade: "It’s a very interesting thing that in times of war, we blockade our enemies in order to prevent them from getting goods from us. In time of peace we do to ourselves by tariffs what we do to our enemy in time of war.”

Oswald Garrison Villard said, "Few men made more stirring and valuable contributions to the economic life of modern America than did Henry George," and that what George had "written about protection and free trade is as fresh and as valuable today as it was at the hour in which it was penned."

Table of contents
The table of contents are as follows:
 Chapter 1 – Introductory
 Chapter 2 – Clearing Ground
 Chapter 3 – Protection as a Universal Need
 Chapter 4 – Trade
 Chapter 5 – Protection and Producers
 Chapter 6 – Tariffs for Revenue
 Chapter 7 – Tariffs for Protection
 Chapter 8 – The Encouragement of Industry
 Chapter 9 – Exports and Imports
 Chapter 10 – Confusions Arising from the Use of Money
 Chapter 11 – Do High Wages Necessitate Protection?
 Chapter 12 – Of Advantages and Disadvantages as Reasons for Protection
 Chapter 13 – Protection and Producers
 Chapter 14 – Protection and Wages
 Chapter 15 – The Abolition of Protection
 Chapter 16 – Inadequacy of the Free Trade Argument
 Chapter 17 – The Real Strength of Protection
 Chapter 18 – The Paradox
 Chapter 19 – The Robber that Takes All that is Left
 Chapter 20 – True Free Trade
 Chapter 21 – Free Trade and Socialism
 Chapter 22 – Practical Politics
 Chapter 23 – Appendices

See also
 Georgism

References

External links

Online editions of Protection or Free Trade
 At truefreetrade.org
 At mises.org
 At schalkenbach.org
 At The Online Library of Liberty

1886 non-fiction books
Classical liberalism
Books about economic policy
Georgist publications
Protectionism
Free trade